Ibn Alqama (also Ibn Alkama, Bin Alqamah, etc.) may refer to:

Abu Ya'fur ibn Alqama (fl. early 6th century), Lakhmid general
Abu Haritha bin Alqamah (fl. early 7th century), bishop of Najran
Sa'id ibn Yazid ibn Alqama al-Azdi, governor of Egypt in 682–684
Abu Ghalib Tammam ibn Alkama (fl. 8th–9th century), Umayyad general in Spain
Tammam ibn Alkama al-Wazir (fl. 9th century), Umayyad poet
Ibn Alqama (d. 1116), Valencian historian

See also
Alqama (disambiguation)